Metzervisse (Lorraine Franconian: Metzerwiss) is a commune in the Moselle department in Grand Est in north-eastern France.

Geography

Climate
The climate in the area is mild with few extremes of temperature and ample precipitation in all months.  The Köppen Climate Classification subtype for this climate is "Cfb" (Marine West Coast Climate).

See also
 Communes of the Moselle department

References

External links
 

Communes of Moselle (department)